In Greek mythology, Autarieus was one of the sons of Illyrius and the eponymous founder of the Autariates.

Note

Characters in Greek mythology